"Drive You Crazy" is a song by American rapper Pitbull, featuring American singer Jason Derulo and fellow American rapper Juicy J. The song was released on August 21, 2015 as the fifth official single from Pitbull's eighth studio album Globalization.

Chart performance

References 

2014 songs
2015 singles
Pitbull (rapper) songs
Jason Derulo songs
Juicy J songs
Songs written by Jason Derulo
Songs written by Juicy J
Songs written by Pitbull (rapper)
Songs written by Dr. Luke
Songs written by Theron Thomas
Songs written by Timothy Thomas
Song recordings produced by Dr. Luke
Song recordings produced by Cirkut (record producer)